Victor Hugo Nellenbogen (1 May 1888 – 22 January 1959) was a Hungarian-American architect known for his Art Deco and Mediterranean Revival designs in Miami Beach during the first half of the 20th century.  His notable buildings include the Savoy Plaza Hotel on Ocean Drive, the Lord Tarleton Hotel on 40th and 41st Streets, and the Sterling Building on Lincoln Road.

Three renovations of his historic buildings have won the Barbara Baer Capitman Award, given by the Miami Design Preservation League for the "Best of the Best" in architectural historic restorations in Miami Beach.

Notable Miami Beach buildings 
 Alamac Apartments (1934)
 Savoy Plaza Hotel (1935)
 Chelsea Hotel (1936)
 7337 Harding Apartments (1937)
 Lord Tarleton Hotel (1940)
 Moderne Olsen Hotel (1941)
 Sterling Building (1941)

See also 
Art Deco
Miami Beach Architectural District

References 

20th-century American architects
Art Deco architects
1888 births
1959 deaths
Austro-Hungarian emigrants to the United States
People from the Kingdom of Hungary
Architects from Budapest
Cooper Union alumni